Island Macaskin or MacAskin is an island in Loch Craignish, in the Inner Hebrides of Scotland. It is owned by the Jenkin family and has been since 1904.

History and wildlife
The island was formerly inhabited, and unusually for the Scottish islands, is quite well wooded, with some mature trees scattered about. It appears to have been abandoned in the 1880s, but there is ample evidence of human habitation on it, including a number of walls, a sheep pen, and a lime kiln.

A number of wild flowers grow here, though not as many as on nearby Eilean Rìgh.

Geography and geology

The island is long and narrow, aligned southwest–northeast, parallel to the nearby shore of the mainland. It is basically a ridge, with the west being higher than the east. A line of skerries extend from the south of the island into the Sound of Jura.

The geology is metamorphic apidiorite with some Dalriadan quartzite at the south end.

It is surrounded by various smaller islands including Eilean nan Gabhar, Eilean nan Coinean, Garbh Rèisa, Rèisa an t-Sruith, Rèisa MhicPhàidein and Eilean na Cille.

Footnotes

External links

Uninhabited islands of Argyll and Bute
Lime kilns in Scotland